Ovidiu Liviu Dănănae (born 26 August 1985) is a Romanian football coach and a former player who played as a right back for teams such as: CSM Reșița, FC U Craiova 1948, Tom Tomsk or Apollon Limassol, among others.

Career statistics

International

Honours
FC U Craiova 1948
Liga II: 2005–06
Liga III: 2019–20
Liga IV – Dolj County: 2017–18
Cupa României – Dolj County: 2017–18

External links
 
 
 
 

1985 births
Living people
Sportspeople from Craiova
Romanian footballers
Romanian expatriate footballers
Romania international footballers
Association football defenders
CSM Reșița players
FC U Craiova 1948 players
FC Tom Tomsk players
FC Steaua București players
CS Turnu Severin players
Apollon Limassol FC players
CS Universitatea Craiova players
CS Sportul Snagov players
Liga I players
Liga II players
Russian Premier League players
Cypriot First Division players
Expatriate footballers in Russia
Expatriate footballers in Cyprus
Romanian expatriate sportspeople in Russia
Romanian expatriate sportspeople in Cyprus